Three Days of Christmas is a 2019 Spanish-language television series starring Victoria Abril, Carles Arquimbau, and Mae Aswell. The plot is set in the aftermath of the Spanish Civil War and told during across three different time periods. It was released on December 6, 2019, on Netflix.

Cast

Episodes

Awards and nominations 

|-
| align = "center" | 2021 || 8th  || colspan = 2 | Best Miniseries ||  || align = "center" | 
|}

See also
 List of Christmas films

References

External links
 
 

Christmas television series
2010s Spanish drama television series
Spanish-language Netflix original programming
2019 Spanish television series debuts
2019 Spanish television series endings